Willard Craig Broadwater (August 8, 1950  – December 18, 2006) was a United States district judge of the United States District Court for the Northern District of West Virginia.

Education and career

Born in Elk City, Oklahoma, Broadwater graduated from Paden City High School in West Virginia and received a Bachelor of Arts degree from West Virginia University in 1972 and a Juris Doctor from West Virginia University College of Law in 1977. He was also a Lieutenant in the United States Army from 1972 to 1982. He was in private practice in Wheeling, West Virginia from 1977 to 1983. He was a Hearing examiner for the West Virginia Worker's Compensation Fund from 1978 to 1981. He was a Special prosecuting attorney of Ohio County, West Virginia from 1982 to 1983, and then became a circuit court judge for the First Judicial Circuit of West Virginia, from 1983 to 1996.

Military career 
Among his many assignments, General Broadwater volunteered for duty in Iraq where he commanded the Joint Interagency Task Force for High Value Individuals (JIATF-HVI) from mid 2005 to early 2006.  At his death, he was a Brigadier General in the West Virginia National Guard.

Federal judicial service

On January 26, 1996, Broadwater was nominated by President Bill Clinton to a seat on the United States District Court for the Northern District of West Virginia vacated by Robert Earl Maxwell. Broadwater was confirmed by the United States Senate on July 12, 1996, and received his commission on July 26, 1996. Broadwater served in that capacity until his death, in 2006, in Pittsburgh, Pennsylvania.

Death

Broadwater died on December 18, 2006, at the University of Pittsburgh Medical Center of complications of cancer.

Notes

References
  

1950 births
2006 deaths
20th-century American judges
20th-century American lawyers
21st-century American judges
County prosecuting attorneys in West Virginia
Judges of the United States District Court for the Northern District of West Virginia
Lawyers from Wheeling, West Virginia
Military personnel from West Virginia
Paden City High School alumni
People from Elk City, Oklahoma
People from Paden City, West Virginia
Politicians from Wheeling, West Virginia
United States Army officers
United States district court judges appointed by Bill Clinton
West Virginia circuit court judges
West Virginia lawyers
West Virginia National Guard personnel
West Virginia University alumni
West Virginia University College of Law alumni